The 2003 Adidas International was a combined men's and women's tennis tournament played on outdoor hard courts at the NSW Tennis Centre in Sydney in Australia that was part of the International Series of the 2003 ATP Tour and of Tier II of the 2003 WTA Tour. The tournament ran from 5 through 12 January 2003. Lee Hyung-taik and Kim Clijsters won the singles titles.

Finals

Men's singles

 Lee Hyung-taik defeated  Juan Carlos Ferrero 4–6, 7–6(8–6), 7–6(7–4)
 It was Lee's 1st title of the year and the 1st of his career.

Women's singles

 Kim Clijsters defeated  Lindsay Davenport 6–4, 6–3
 It was Clijsters' 1st title of the year and the 15th of her career.

Men's doubles

 Paul Hanley /  Nathan Healey defeated  Mahesh Bhupathi /  Joshua Eagle 7–6(7–3), 6–4
 It was Hanley's 1st title of the year and the 2nd of his career. It was Healey's only title of the year and the 2nd of his career.

Women's doubles

 Kim Clijsters /  Ai Sugiyama defeated  Conchita Martínez /  Rennae Stubbs 6–3, 6–3
 It was Clijsters' 2nd title of the year and the 16th of her career. It was Sugiyama's 1st title of the year and the 25th of her career.

External links
 Official website
 ATP tournament profile
 WTA tournament profile

 
Adidas International, 2003